The 427th Maryland General Assembly convened in a regular session on January 13, 2010, and adjourned sine die on April 12, 2010.

Senate

Party composition

Leadership

Members

Notes
 This Senator was originally appointed to office by the Governor to fill an open seat.

 The President of the Senate does not serve on any of the four standing legislative committees. He does, however, serve on both the Executive Nominations and the Rules Committees.

House of Delegates

Party composition

Leadership

Members

Notable legislation enacted
 Primary and Secondary Education Funding The budget bill, Senate Bill 140, enacted by the 427th Maryland General Assembly increased Maryland State aid for primary and secondary education by $210.5 million in fiscal 2011 to a total of $5.7 billion. State aid provided directly to the local boards of education was increased by $119.7 million or 2.5%, while teachers’ retirement costs, which are paid by the State on behalf of the local school systems, will increase from $759.1 million to $849.8 million.
 Senate Bill 517 - Maryland Gang Prosecution Act of 2010 The increasing number of gangs had created a significant problem in most areas of the country, including Maryland. More than 600 active gangs are reported to be in the State with more than 11,000 members. The Maryland Department of Public Safety and Correctional Services has also identified approximately 4,000 inmates as participating in more than 260 different gangs inside its correctional facilities. Inter alia, SB 517 modifies the definition of "criminal gang" by repealing the requirement that an association of three or more persons whose members meet certain criteria be ongoing and by repealing "an identifying sign, symbol, name, leader, or purpose" as common factors and substituting "an overt or covert organizational or command structure."
 House Bill 934 - Distracted Driving, Handheld Cell Phones This bill outlaws the use of handheld phones by drivers while operating a motor vehicle. The bill also prohibits drivers of a school vehicles, the holders of a learner’s instructional permit or provisional driver’s licenses from driving and talking on hand held cell phones as well. The bill's prohibitions do not apply to the emergency use of a handheld telephone. Commercial drivers using push-to-talk technology are exempted as well.

Notes

See also
 Current members of the Maryland State Senate

References
General
 
 
 
 

Specific

External links
 Maryland General Assembly

2010 in Maryland
Maryland legislative sessions